

Men's Team 
Each team received a 2 points for each match won.

Women's Team 
Each team received a 2 points for each match won.

References

2003 Games of the Small States of Europe
Games of the Small States of Europe
2003